Cirque hollandais is a 1924 Dutch silent film directed by Theo Frenkel.

Cast
 Louis Bouwmeester - circusowner Hendrik van Dalen / cattle farmer Willem van Dalen
 Esther De Boer-van Rijk - Willem van Dalens' wife
 Kitty Kluppell - Willem van Dalens' daughter
 Agnès Marou - Hendriks daughter
 Frits Bouwmeester - Louisot
 Alfred Harvey - Wrestler
 Willem Hunsche
 Johannes Heesters
 Piet Köhler
 Adrienne Solser
 Aaf Bouber
 Piet Fuchs
 Jo Bouwmeester-Kluun
 Rafael Bouwmeester
 Margot Laurentius-Jonas
 Dirk Janse

External links 
 

1924 films
Dutch silent feature films
Dutch black-and-white films
Films directed by Theo Frenkel